IIA may refer to:

Independence of irrelevant alternatives
Indian Institute of Architects 
Indian Institute of Astrophysics
Indianapolis International Airport
Institute of Internal Auditors
Information Industry Association
International Investment Agreement
Islamabad International Airport
IIa or II-a, a subtype of Type II supernova
A rating in the Hong Kong motion picture rating system

See also
Iia, Estonia, village in Estonia
2A (disambiguation), including a list of topics named II-A, etc.

sv:IIA